District 7 is an electoral district in Malta.  It was established in 1921.  Its boundaries have changed many times but it currently consists of the localities of Ħad-Dingli, L-Imġarr, L-Imtarfa, Ir-Rabat and part of Ħaż-Żebbuġ.

Representatives

References 

 

Districts of Malta